Out of Order  is the fifteenth studio album by Rod Stewart released in 1988. It features the hit singles "Lost in You", "Forever Young", "My Heart Can't Tell You No", and "Crazy About Her". The album was produced by Stewart and members of The Power Station: guitarist Andy Taylor (also a former member of Duran Duran), and bassist Bernard Edwards (formerly of Chic). Chic drummer Tony Thompson also plays on the record.

Critical reception
The album was considered by many critics a return to form after a series of less successful albums. Stephen Thomas Erlewine of AllMusic in a retrospective review called it "well-constructed", and Rolling Stone magazine called it a "confident, well-written, high-voltage work". Robert Christgau, however, gave it a C, unfavorably comparing the album to the work of The Power Station.

Commercial performance
The album reached No. 20 on the Billboard 200, eventually going 2× Platinum, which made it Stewart's best-selling album of the 1980s.

Each single released from the album went to the Top 20 of either the Mainstream Rock Tracks chart, the Hot Adult Contemporary Tracks chart, or the Billboard Hot 100. Music videos were also produced and released for each. The most successful single was "My Heart Can't Tell You No", which reached the Top 5 of both the Hot Adult Contemporary Tracks and Billboard Hot 100. The album had four charting hits in the U.S., the biggest being "My Heart Can't Tell You No" at No. 4.

In January 1989, immediately following the broadcast of Super Bowl XXIII, NBC Sports used "Forever Young" as the soundtrack for a year-in-review montage showcasing highlights from the 1988 Summer Olympics, the 1988 World Series, the 1989 Fiesta Bowl, and Super Bowl XXIII. All four events had been broadcast by NBC.

The structure of the lyrics to "Forever Young" are very similar to a Bob Dylan song of the same title. When this was realized, the song was then sent to Dylan, out of respect, asking whether he had a problem with it. Stewart and Dylan agreed to participate in the ownership of the song and share Stewart's royalties.

In Brazil, the album was certified Gold in 1994.

Track listing
 "Lost in You" (Stewart, Andy Taylor) – 4:59
 "The Wild Horse" (Stewart, Taylor) – 4:58
 "Lethal Dose of Love" (Taylor, Stewart, Tony Brock) – 4:38
 "Forever Young" (Jim Cregan, Kevin Savigar, Bob Dylan, Stewart) – 4:03
 "My Heart Can't Tell You No" (Simon Climie, Dennis Morgan) – 5:12
 "Dynamite" (Taylor, Stewart) – 4:16
 "Nobody Knows You When You're Down and Out" (Jimmy Cox) – 3:50
 "Crazy About Her" (Duane Hitchings, Cregan, Stewart) – 4:53 
 "Try a Little Tenderness" (Jimmy Campbell, Reginald Connelly, Harry M. Woods) – 4:27
 "When I Was Your Man" (Savigar, Stewart) – 5:14
 "Almost Illegal" (Stewart, Taylor) –  4:27

Extended version, 2009.

12.-Days of Rage
13.-Crazy About Her (Kyle Wyld West Edit) [Instrumental]
14.-Crazy About Her (Al B. Sure Remix)
15.-Crazy About Her (B! Crazy Dub Mix)
16.-Forever Young (Live)
17.-This Old Heart of Mine (Live)

Personnel 

 Rod Stewart – vocals
 Bill Payne – acoustic piano (2, 6)
 William "Smitty" Smith – Hammond organ (2)
 Kevin Savigar – keyboards (3–5, 7–10)
 Duane Hitchings – keyboards (8) 
 Michael Landau – guitar (1, 2, 4, 6–10), guitar solo (7)
 Andy Taylor – guitar (1–6, 11), guitar solo (1, 2, 4)
 David Lindley – mandolin (1, 2), slide guitar (7), fiddle (11)
 Jim Cregan – acoustic guitar (4), acoustic guitar solo (5), guitar (5, 7, 8)
 Eddie Martinez – guitar (9)
 Bob Glaub – bass (1, 5, 11)
 Bernard Edwards – bass (2, 3, 4, 6–10)
 Tony Thompson – drums (1, 2, 6, 9, 10)
 Tony Brock – drums (3–5, 11), programming (7, 8)
 Bobbye Hall – percussion (8)
 Lenny Pickett – saxophone (3, 7)
 Jimmy Roberts – saxophone (6, 8, 10), saxophone solo (9)
 David Woodford – saxophone (6, 8, 10)
 Earl Gardner – trumpet (3, 7)
 Bruce Miller – string arrangements (1, 5, 9, 10), brass arrangements (9)
 Kelly Emberg – backing vocals (1)
 Lyn Collins – backing vocals (2)
 Rita Johnson – backing vocals (2)
 Robert Sheen – backing vocals (2)

Production
 Producers – Bernard Edwards, Rod Stewart and Andy Taylor.
 Production Coordinator – Malcolm Cullimore
 Engineers – Jeff Hendrickson, Steve MacMillan, David Tickle and Paul Wertheimer.
 Assistant Engineer – Alan Abrahamson
 Mixing – Bernard Edwards and Steve MacMillan
 Mastered by Bob Ludwig at Masterdisk (New York, NY).
 Art Direction and Design – Janet Levinson
 Photography – Randee St. Nicholas
 Lettering – Margo Chase

Charts

Weekly charts

Year-end charts

Certifications

References

1988 albums
Rod Stewart albums
Albums produced by Bernard Edwards
Albums recorded at Record Plant (Los Angeles)
Warner Records albums
Warner Music Group albums